Ban Pokpaek station is a railway station located in Khok Sawang Subdistrict, Saraburi City, Saraburi. It is the location of a petroleum oil terminal, operated by the Thai Petroleum Pipeline Co Ltd., a subsidiary of PTT.

Train services 
 Rapid 145/146 Bangkok–Ubon Ratchathani–Bangkok
 Ordinary No. 233/234 Bangkok–Surin–Bangkok
 Commuter No. 339/340 Bangkok–Kaeng Khoi Junction–Bangkok (weekdays only)
 Commuter No. 341/342 Bangkok–Kaeng Khoi Junction–Bangkok (weekdays only)
 Commuter No. 343/344 Bangkok–Kaeng Khoi Junction–Bangkok (weekends only)

References 
 
 

Railway stations in Thailand